George Alanson Blauvelt (November 11, 1866 – October 16, 1924) was an American lawyer and politician from New York.

Life
He was born in Ramapo, New York, to John Lewis Blauvelt and Lucinda (Gurnee) Blauvelt. He attended Mt. Chappaqua Institute, and graduated from Cornell University in 1890, and from Columbia Law School in 1892.

In 1897, he was sued by William R. Thompson for $50,000 in damages, because Blauvelt had "alienated Thompson's wife's affections".

Blauvelt was a member of the New York State Assembly (Rockland Co.) in 1911 and 1912; and of the New York State Senate (23rd D.) in 1913 and 1914.

In September 1914, he opened a law firm in Manhattan with New York Attorney General Thomas Carmody and Deputy Attorney General Joseph A. Kellogg, who both had just resigned, but left the firm in October 1915. He was a delegate to the New York State Constitutional Convention of 1915.

He was a Trustee of Cornell University from 1919 until his death. He died on October 16, 1924, at his home in Monsey, New York, of pneumonia.

Sources
 Official New York from Cleveland to Hughes by Charles Elliott Fitch (Hurd Publishing Co., New York and Buffalo, 1911, Vol. IV; pg. 360)
 THE BLAUVELT CASE AGAIN in NYT on May 10, 1897
 THE CASE AGAINST BLAUVELT in NYT on May 11, 1897
 A Correction for George A. Blauvelt in NYT on December 20, 1916
 George A. Blauvelt '90 Dies in Cornell Alumni News (October 23, 1924; pg. 58)

1866 births
1924 deaths
Democratic Party New York (state) state senators
People from Ramapo, New York
Democratic Party members of the New York State Assembly
Cornell University alumni
Deaths from pneumonia in New York (state)
Columbia Law School alumni